Joseph Ryan Harrington (born February 19, 1999) is an American actor, dancer, and singer currently residing in Cincinnati, Ohio.

Career
Harrington began his career on stage in 2005 with the Cincinnati Ballet.  There he performed in The Nutcracker in 2005 and portrayed Michael Darling in Peter Pan for the 2008–2009 season.

The Broadway debut for Harrington came in November 2007 with the revival of How the Grinch Stole Christmas!. The production was able to re-open, after closing for two weeks in November, despite the stagehands' strike.  The show was able to reopen due to its limited holiday run. 

For nearly a year, Harrington participated in what was referred to as "Billy Camp."  On June 10, 2010, Harrington was cast in the Broadway production of Billy Elliot the Musical.  On October 24 of that year, he made his debut as "Billy" at the Imperial Theatre as the production's twelfth "Billy." He remained with the production in the role until the show closed on January 8, 2012.

Stage

Film

Television

References

External links 
 
 
 Joseph Ryan Harrington at Playbill

1999 births
Living people
American male stage actors
American male television actors
American male film actors
American male child actors